Rishit Saini (born 22 October 1990) is an Indian former cricketer. He played one first-class match for Delhi in 2011.

See also
 List of Delhi cricketers

References

External links
 

1990 births
Living people
Indian cricketers
Delhi cricketers
Cricketers from Delhi